Davie Johnston (born 29 February 1948) is a Scottish footballer, who played for Dundee and Montrose.

External links

1948 births
Living people
Association football fullbacks
Scottish footballers
Banks O' Dee F.C. players
Dundee F.C. players
Montrose F.C. players
Scottish Football League players
Footballers from Aberdeen